Bromwell Wire Works is a historic industrial complex located at Greensburg, Decatur County, Indiana. The original factory was built in 1903, and is a two-story brick building on a rock-faced ashlar foundation and with a gable roof. It has a heavy timber-frame structure and Victorian style detailing. Also on the property are the contributing -story brick boiler house (c. 1903), water tower (1928), and galvanizing shop (1922).

It was added to the National Register of Historic Places in 1990.

References

External links

Industrial buildings and structures on the National Register of Historic Places in Indiana
Victorian architecture in Indiana
Industrial buildings completed in 1903
Buildings and structures in Decatur County, Indiana
National Register of Historic Places in Decatur County, Indiana